Tibor Halmay (20 December 1894 – 2 November 1944) was a Hungarian stage and film actor. He was born in the Austro-Hungarian Empire, and appeared in a mixture of German and Hungarian films during his career. He is sometimes credited as Tibor von Halmay.

Selected filmography
 My Daughter's Tutor (1929)
 A Tango for You (1930)
 Two Hearts in Waltz Time (1930)
 The Forester's Daughter (1931)
 Her Majesty the Barmaid (1931)
 The Girl and the Boy (1931)
 The Merry Wives of Vienna (1931)
 The Wrong Husband (1931)
 The Old Scoundrel (1932)
 Gitta Discovers Her Heart (1932)
 The Naked Truth (1932)
 Two Hearts Beat as One (1932)
 And the Plains Are Gleaming (1933)
 The Racokzi March (1933)
 Spring Parade (1934)
 A Precocious Girl (1934)
 Everything for the Woman (1934)
 Leap into Bliss (1934)
 The Last Waltz (1934)
 Where the Lark Sings (1936)
 Escape to the Adriatic (1937)
 Roxy and the Wonderteam (1938)
 Linen from Ireland (1939)
 Hotel Sacher (1939)
 Woman Made to Measure (1940)
 Mask in Blue (1943)
 Orient Express (1944)

References

Bibliography
 Robert von Dassanowsky. Austrian Cinema: A History. McFarland, 2005.

External links

1894 births
1944 deaths
Hungarian male film actors
Hungarian male silent film actors
Hungarian male stage actors
People from Timiș County